MOSiR Stadion is a multi-purpose stadium in Wodzisław Śląski, Poland.  It is used mostly for football matches and served as the home stadium of Odra Wodzisław.  The stadium has a capacity of 7,400 people. Its facilities include heated turf, floodlights emitting 2,000 lux,  tennis courts, gymnasium, and office building. 

In 2007 Zagłębie Sosnowiec, 2008-2011 Piast Gliwice and in 2011, Podbeskidzie Bielsko-Biała began using the stadium while their own ground was undergoing reconstruction work. In 2012 it also hosted Pre-season two friendly matches Karpaty Lviv. 

Football venues in Poland
Sports venues in Silesian Voivodeship
Multi-purpose stadiums in Poland
Wodzisław Śląski